Hradčany Square (Czech: Hradčanské náměstí) is a square near Prague Castle in Prague, Czech Republic.

Features
 Statue of Saint Wenceslas (Vosmík)

References

External links

 

Hradčany
Squares in Prague